Church of Holy Trinity is an Anglican church in Hotwells, Bristol, England. It has been designated as a grade II* listed building.

History

The church was built in 1829 by Charles Robert Cockerell with an interior by T Burrough and consecrated on 10 November 1830.

The church was completely rebuilt after being gutted during the Bristol Blitz of World War II. Nothing survives of the original cruciform, galleried interior, except the use of a shallow glazed dome. The south front of the building which faces the main A4 road has a symmetrical design of five round arched windows. There is a central porch with Doric pilasters.

Since the rebuilding in the 1950s a kitchen, toilets and office space have been added. In 2004 the roof was repaired and asbestos removed from the dome. The pews can be moved for concerts and special services.

The parish and benefice is part of the Diocese of Bristol.

Archives
Parish records of Holy Trinity church, Hotwells, Bristol are held at Bristol Archives (Ref. P.HTC)  (online catalogue) including baptism and marriage registers. The archive also includes records of the incumbent, churchwardens, parochial church council, schools and vestry, plus plans and photographs.

See also
 Churches in Bristol
 Grade II* listed buildings in Bristol

References

External links

 Holy Trinity, Hotwells

Churches completed in 1829
19th-century Church of England church buildings
Church of England church buildings in Bristol
Diocese of Bristol
Georgian architecture in Bristol
Grade II* listed churches in Bristol
1830 establishments in England